The Hondo River Bridge was a historic bridge over the Hondo River in Comerío municipality, Puerto Rico. As of 1995, it was the oldest bridge truss in Puerto Rico, employing a double Warren pony truss design and unique open web transverse joists. It was originally installed in 1881 as one of three spans of the Reyes Católicos Bridge over the Plata River on the San Juan–Mayagüez road, using metal parts fabricated in Belgium. After a hurricane destroyed one of the other spans of the Reyes Católicos Bridge in 1899, this surviving span was moved and re-installed on new abutments under the supervision of engineer Rafael Nones in 1908, as part of the Comerío–Barranquitas road. It was finally removed and replaced in 2001.

The bridge was added to the U.S. National Register of Historic Places in 1995.

See also
List of bridges documented by the Historic American Engineering Record in Puerto Rico
National Register of Historic Places listings in Comerío, Puerto Rico

References

External links

Summary sheet from the Puerto Rico State Historic Preservation Office 

, National Register of Historic Places cover documentation

Road bridges on the National Register of Historic Places in Puerto Rico
Comerío, Puerto Rico
Bridges completed in 1908
1908 establishments in Puerto Rico
Historic American Engineering Record in Puerto Rico
Metal bridges
Warren truss bridges
Relocated buildings and structures
2001 disestablishments in Puerto Rico
Former bridges
Demolished but still listed on the National Register of Historic Places
Former buildings and structures in the United States
Bridges completed in 1881
1880s establishments in Puerto Rico